Ailigandí Airport  is an airstrip serving Ailigandí, an island town in the Guna Yala comarca (indigenous province) of Panama. There are no roads near the airstrip.

See also

Transport in Panama
List of airports in Panama

References

External links
 OpenStreetMap - Ailigandí
 OurAirports - Ailigandí Airport
 FallingRain - Ailigandí Airport

 Google Earth

Airports in Panama
Guna Yala